Khin Moe Wai is a footballer from Myanmar who currently plays as a midfielder.

International goals

See also
List of Myanmar women's international footballers

External links 
 

Living people
Burmese women's footballers
Myanmar women's international footballers
Women's association football midfielders
1989 births
Southeast Asian Games bronze medalists for Myanmar
Southeast Asian Games medalists in football
Competitors at the 2007 Southeast Asian Games
Competitors at the 2017 Southeast Asian Games
Competitors at the 2019 Southeast Asian Games